Morpheis lelex is a moth in the family Cossidae. It was described by Paul Dognin in 1891. It is found in Venezuela.

References

Natural History Museum Lepidoptera generic names catalog

Zeuzerinae
Moths described in 1891